Broken Obelisk is a sculpture designed by Barnett Newman between 1963 and 1967. Fabricated from three tons of Cor-Ten steel, which acquires a rust-colored patina, it is the largest and best known of his six sculptures.

Four multiples of the sculpture exist. Recent articles regarding this sculpture contradict one another with regard to the individual histories of its first three multiples. The following entry attempts to resolve these contradictions, but further research of primary sources (1967–1971) is required to track the history of each one more accurately.

The first two multiples of the sculpture were fabricated by Lippincott, Inc. in North Haven, Connecticut in 1966–67. The sculpture first appeared on display outside the Corcoran Gallery of Art in Washington, D.C. (as part of an exhibit titled "Scale and Content" (1967), which included Tony Smith's Smoke and Glass and Ronald Bladen's The X), and in front of the Seagram Building in New York City. Broken Obelisk generated some controversy in Washington, as it appeared to be a reference to a broken upside-down Washington Monument at a time of civil unrest. When Corcoran director James Harithas resigned in 1969, Barnett Newman had the sculpture removed.

A third multiple, which included some internal, structural improvements, was completed in 1969 by Lippincott, Inc., which became part of the permanent collection of the Museum of Modern Art in New York City. For a short period of time in 1969–70, the first three multiples of this sculpture sat side by side at the Lippincott, Inc. foundry in North Haven. One was secured by John de Menil with a matching grant from the National Foundation for the Arts and Humanities and was installed on the grounds of the Rothko Chapel in Houston in 1970, surrounded by a reflecting pool. As a condition set by de Menil, the sculpture in Houston is dedicated to Martin Luther King Jr. Virginia Wright secured another multiple, which was installed in Red Square on the campus of the University of Washington in Seattle in 1971.

With the permission of the Barnett Newman Foundation, a fourth multiple was commissioned in 2003 and completed in 2005–06 by Lippincott, Merrifield, and Roberts. This last of the four multiples was installed in front of the Neue Nationalgalerie in Berlin in 2007–08 and later acquired by Storm King Art Center. In the summer of 2014, all four multiples were on display in the United States at the following locations: Rothko Chapel, Houston; Red Square, University of Washington, Seattle; Museum of Modern Art, New York City; and Storm King Art Center, New Windsor, New York.

Art critic Robert Hughes, writing on Broken Obelisk in 1971, said:

References

External links 
 Images of Broken Obelisk by Barnett Newman
 Broken Obelisk - Barnett Newman, Outdoor Sculpture Gallery, Nassau County Museum of Art
 Broken Obelisk on the East Terrace at the Philadelphia Museum of Art
 Broken Obelisk at MoMA in New York City
 Broken Obelisk: A Conservation Case Study

1963 sculptures
Outdoor sculptures in Seattle
Outdoor sculptures in Houston
Sculptures of the Museum of Modern Art (New York City)
Works by Barnett Newman
Buildings and structures in Houston
Steel sculptures
University of Washington campus
Obelisks in the United States
Neartown, Houston
Memorials to Martin Luther King Jr.